Dalaman is a district, as well as the central town of that district, situated on the southwestern coast of Turkey, in the Muğla Province.

Dalaman Stream (Dalaman çayı) forms much of the western border of the district, where its neighbors are Köyceğiz and Ortaca districts. The town of Dalaman is located in the coastal plain, whereas the rest of the district – towards Fethiye district on the coast and towards the high mountains on the northern border to Denizli Province – is upland, dominated by the valleys of the Dalaman Stream's eastern tributaries.

Dalaman Airport 

Dalaman Airport serves as a gateway to the tourists who visit this part of Turkey every year, heading especially to seaside resorts to the west and east of Dalaman such as Marmaris, Fethiye, Köyceğiz, Dalyan, Ölüdeniz, Hisarönü and also Dalaman itself. Dalaman Airport  is small in comparison to other airports in Turkey, has parking spaces for 14 jet aircraft and is served by many operators. Turkish Airlines offer daily flights to Turkey's commercial and financial capital Istanbul. The Airport serves as a seasonal base for other airlines notably Pegasus Airlines and Free Bird Airlines. A new international airport terminal has recently been opened.

Climate
Dalaman has a hot Mediterranean climate. Summers are long and dry whilst winters are short and cool. Dalaman is a very sunny place throughout the whole of the year especially in June and July. Dalaman holds the record for the highest recorded air temperature in Turkey.

References

External links
Dalaman Airport official website 
Interactive Virtual Tour of Dalaman Area

Turkish Riviera
Populated places in Muğla Province
Districts of Muğla Province